Thomas Nicholas Meschery (born Tomislav Nikolayevich Meshcheryakov; October 26, 1938) is an American former professional basketball player. Born in China, Meschery was a power forward with a 10-year National Basketball Association career from 1961 to 1971. He played for the Philadelphia/San Francisco Warriors and the Seattle SuperSonics. He played in the 1963 NBA All-Star Game, making him the first foreign-born NBA player to be selected as an NBA All-Star. The Warriors not only retired his number 14, but also gave him a unique honor by incorporating the number into the team's logo from 1967 till 1974.

Early years 
Meschery was born as Tomislav Nikolayevich Meshcheryakov in Harbin, Manchukuo. His parents were Russian emigrants who fled from the October Revolution in 1917.  The Meschery family was later relocated to a Japanese internment camp near Tokyo during World War II.

After the war, Meschery and his parents emigrated to the United States. It was also in this phase of his life where his father renamed the family "Meschery" due to the anti-Communist/anti-Soviet Red Scare under Joseph McCarthy, and Tomislav Nikolayevich was renamed Thomas Nicholas, which later was abbreviated to Tom. Living in San Francisco, California, Meschery attended Lowell High School.

After graduating in 1957, he went to Saint Mary's College of California in Moraga.  Meschery helped Saint Mary's reach the NCAA Tournament's Elite Eight in 1959. Two years later, he was chosen as a First Team All-American, and was named the West Coast Conference Player of the Year.  He received his Bachelor of Arts degree in 1961.

Professional basketball career 
Standing 6 ft 6 in, Meschery also was a highly talented basketball player. After graduating from St. Mary's, he was drafted by the Philadelphia Warriors as the 7th pick overall in the 1961 NBA draft. Meschery played alongside legend Wilt Chamberlain, to whom he later dedicated a poem.  Meschery was the starting forward on the 1961-62 Philadelphia Warriors team in which Chamberlain scored 100 points. Meschery led the NBA in personal fouls in 1962 and he became the first foreign born player to play in an NBA All-Star Game when he played in the 1963 NBA All-Star Game. The following year, Meschery made his first Finals appearance, as the Warriors lost 4-1 to the Boston Celtics. Chamberlain left the Warriors in 1965, returning to his home town Philadelphia, to play with the 76ers. The Warriors however, strengthened by the arrival of Rick Barry, made it to the 1967 NBA Finals, in which they lost to Chamberlain's 76ers. After his second NBA Finals appearance, Meschery was selected by the NBA's Seattle SuperSonics during the 1967 NBA Expansion Draft.

In the SuperSonics' inaugural season, Meschery led the team in rebounds (10.2 per game) as well as personal fouls.   He retired following the 1970–71 season, having played four seasons for the SuperSonics.

After retiring as a player, Meschery became head coach of the ABA's Carolina Cougars, which he guided to a record of 35–49 in the 1971–72 season before being replaced by Larry Brown.

Meschery has been inducted into the San Francisco High School Hall of Fame; Saint Mary's College Hall of Fame (his college jersey #31 retired); and the Bay Area Sports Hall of Fame.

Post-basketball life 
Meschery published his first book of poems in 1970, and returned to school after his coaching stint, receiving his Master of Fine Arts degree from the University of Iowa in 1974. He studied poetry with Mark Strand, U.S. poet laureate, at the University of Washington. After receiving his teaching credentials at the University of Nevada, Reno, Meschery taught high school English at Earl Wooster High School and Reno High School in Reno, Nevada, until his retirement from teaching in 2005. He is also a poet, whose works often relate to basketball, teaching, and being a Russian immigrant. In 2002, Meschery was inducted into the Nevada Writers Hall of Fame .

Meschery is now living in Sacramento, California with his wife, artist Melanie Marchant Meschery. His son is Matthew Meschery who is the former lead vocalist of OPM. Meschery continues to write poems, fiction, and essays. He traces his love of writing to his Russian maternal ancestors, Alexei and Leo Tolstoy. Embarking on a new career as a novelist, Meschery has completed three novels in manuscript: Mr. Dolby's Dream, She's Got Game, and The Kid Has Hops and a young adult novel, also in manuscript, entitled The Society for the Prevention of Bullying. He has two published collections of poetry: Nothing We Lose Can Be Replaced and Some Men and Sweat: New and Selected Poems About Sports. Meschery and his wife Melanie are presently collaborating on a book of poems and art about saints.

His blog 'Meschery's Musings' discusses a variety of controversial subjects relating to sports. Each blog ends with a sports poem. Meschery says he wishes to introduce the public to fine contemporary poems whose subject is sports in the same way Garrison Keillor makes poetry in general available to his listeners on his morning radio broadcasts.

NBA career statistics

Regular season

Playoffs

Works 
Over the Rim (1970), New York: McCall Publishing.
Caught in the Pivot: a Diary of a Rookie Coach in the Exploding World of Pro Basketball (1973). Dell.
Nothing We Lose Can Be Replaced (1999), Black Rock Press, University of Nevada, Reno.
Some Men (2012), Black Rock Press, University of Nevada, Reno. Reno, Nevada.
Sweat: New and Selected Poems About Sports (2015), Black Rock Press, University of Nevada, Reno. Reno, Nevada.

References

External links 
Meschery's Musings on Sports, Literature and Life
St Mary's College Hall of Fame Members
BasketballReference.com: Tom Meschery (as player)
BasketballReference.com: Tom Meschery (as coach)
Black Rock Press Info on his book of poetry, "Nothing We Lose Can Be Replaced" (Wayback Machine archive)
Nevada Writers Hall of Fame

1938 births
Living people
All-American college men's basketball players
Amateur Athletic Union men's basketball players
American male poets
American men's basketball players
American people of Russian descent
Basketball players from Harbin
Basketball players from San Francisco
Carolina Cougars coaches
Chinese emigrants to the United States
Chinese people of Russian descent
Continental Basketball Association coaches
Lowell High School (San Francisco) alumni
National Basketball Association All-Stars
National Basketball Association players from China
National Basketball Association players with retired numbers
Parade High School All-Americans (boys' basketball)
People of Manchukuo
Philadelphia Warriors draft picks
Philadelphia Warriors players
Portland Trail Blazers assistant coaches
Power forwards (basketball)
Saint Mary's Gaels men's basketball players
San Francisco Warriors players
Seattle SuperSonics expansion draft picks
Seattle SuperSonics players